Dolichopus canaliculatus is a species of long-legged fly in the family Dolichopodidae.

References

canaliculatus
Articles created by Qbugbot
Insects described in 1869
Taxa named by Carl Gustaf Thomson